Karl Mannström (26 October 1884 – 19 July 1916) was a Swedish modern pentathlete. He competed at the 1912 Summer Olympics.

Mannström became an officer at the Fortification in 1909 and was appointed lieutenant in 1912. He was commanded to the flight school at Malmslätt in 1915 to undergo his flight training and was awarded after the certificate tests June 22, 1915 Swedish aviator diploma no. 28 issued by S.A.S. (Swedish Aeronautical Society). In 1916, Mannström set a Scandinavian altitude record with passengers when he reached an altitude of 4,000 meters. He died in a plane crash just outside Skillingaryd in a Morane-Sauliner aircraft licensed by Thulin's workshops.

References

1884 births
1916 deaths
Swedish male modern pentathletes
Olympic modern pentathletes of Sweden
Modern pentathletes at the 1912 Summer Olympics
People from Sundsvall
Sportspeople from Västernorrland County